Kamni Potok is a settlement on the Temenica River in the Municipality of Trebnje in eastern Slovenia. The area is part of the historical region of Lower Carniola. The municipality is now included in the Southeast Slovenia Statistical Region.

Remains of a Roman-period burial ground, Roman road and water supply have been found at a site near the settlement.

References

External links

Kamni Potok at Geopedia

Populated places in the Municipality of Trebnje